Junto is the seventh album by English electronic music duo Basement Jaxx, released in August 2014 by record labels Atlantic Jaxx and PIAS. It is the duo's first full-length album since Zephyr in 2009, and was announced on 19 May 2014. The title is taken from the song "Power to the People". The album sees a departure from the dark tone of their previous album Zephyr.

The album earned mostly positive reviews upon release, holding an aggregate 71 out of 100 on Metacritic. It reached into the top 30 of the UK Albums Chart, among charting in Australia, Belgium, Ireland, Japan, South Korea and on the United States Billboard charts. Junto spawned five singles, which were "Back 2 the Wild", "What a Difference Your Love Makes", "Unicorn", "Never Say Never" and "Galactical", with "Never Say Never" being a topper of the US Hot Dance Club Songs chart.

Composition
Simon Ratcliffe claimed that they were going for a positive, bright, uplifting and "sort of hopeful" feel with Junto, departing from the darker tone they had on their previous record Zephyr. He reasoned that:

Track information
"Power to the People" took two years to make. The track includes backing vocals from audiences at their December 2013 UK Tour. Most of the orchestral instruments were recorded in the beginning of 2014, with the Recycled Orchestra of Cateura, in Paraguay. Basement Jaxx have stated tried also tried doing other types of the song, including a funk version and an EDM version.

A music video for "What a Difference Your Love Makes", directed by Damian Weilers, was filmed in the township of Alexandra in Johannesburg, South Africa and involves Pantsula dancers. It was released on 9 August 2013.

"Never Say Never", the fourth track went to number one on the US dance club play chart. The music video, about a twerking robot, was widely received and received over 2 million views in its first week of release.

"Buffalo", the eighth song, initially began as a jungle track, with trap elements later added. In obtaining a vocalist, he contacted The Count & Sinden member Graeme Sinden two weeks before the album was finished. Sinden had emailed vocal parts by Mykki Blanco for him to use in the song. Basementt Jaxx claimed Blanco was also supposed to send more vocal stuff to them as well, but he never met the group and "disappeared into the desert."

"Sneakin' Toronto", the tenth track, came from a two-day session with DJ Sneak.

Track twelve, "Mermaid of Salinas" was one of the first songs done for the album. Work on it began circa 2012, when Andrea Terrano, a classical and flamenco guitarist, wrote the melody of the vocal refrain, which he presented to the duo in their old studio. He said that "What he played us was very much like a Latin coffee bar thing" and "decided to give it the Jaxx treatment." When coming up with lyrical themes, they thought of writing them based on a real story: According to Ratcliffe, they used this: "Andrea was in Ibiza on holiday. He had just broken up with someone, and he was feeling a bit blue. He was with Felix and a group of people. He disappeared for a while, and he came back an hour later with this smile on his face. Felix was like, "Where have you been? What have you been up to?" It turned out he had gone paddling in the sea and he got talking to a lady. They were chatting, and they went out further in the sea together. They ended up staying out there and, before they knew it, they were making love in the sea. They came out and said, "Goodbye". That was that! Salinas is a very well-known beach on the island of Ibiza. That's a true story!"

Junto ends with "Love Is At Your Side", a song Ratcliffe wrote for his daughter. He described it as "a song from a father to his daughter" and the vocal melody as "almost country", which singer Sam Brooks "suited it perfectly."

Title

Junto is named after the song "Power to the People". Simon Ratcliffe said the album was titled Junto, because the duo "wanted a title to sum up the spirit of the album, and in English all the words we came up with seemed really kind of dull or insipid." Buxton said that the name "makes people think a bit further and togetherness is about putting yourself 'over there' and seeing how it could be from a different position." Initially, they planned to name the record make.believe, but it was changed after a friend told them that Sony was using those same words (and punctuation) to sell electronics. They also planned to use other titles, including One and Unicorn.

Release 

Junto was released on 25 August 2014 by record labels Atlantic Jaxx and PIAS.

Commercial performance 
In Europe, Junto entered the UK Albums Chart at number 30, and it became Basement Jaxx's seventh top 40 album in the United Kingdom. It also debuted within the top ten of the country's Dance and Independent Albums charts, at number three and seven respectively. In Ireland, it opened at number 65 on the IRMA albums chart, and ten on the Indie chart. It also reached 72 and 105 on the Ultratop Belgian Flanders and Wallonia chart, respectively. In other continents, Junto reached number 168 on the United States Billboard 200, as well as five on the Dance/Electronic Albums chart, 28 on the Independent Albums chart, and four on the Top Heatseekers chart. It was Basement Jaxx's fifth top ten Dance/Electronic albums hit, selling 2,000 units in its first week, according to the Nielsen SoundScan. On the Australian ARIA albums chart, it debuted at number 98, becoming the duo's seventh appearance in the top 100 of the chart, and also reached into the top ten of the dance albums chart at number nine. In Japan, it peaked at number 52 on the Oricon chart.

Critical reception 

Upon release, Junto earned positive response from music critics. As of September 2014, the album holds an aggregate score of 71 out of 100, indicating "generally favorable reviews", based on 27 critics.

In her four-star review for AllMusic, Heather Phares wrote that "Even if Junto isn't quite as brilliant as Basement Jaxx's early EPs or nearly flawless first three albums, it doesn't sound irrelevant or like the duo is chasing after past glories either -- instead, it's some of their most exciting music in quite a while." Randell Roberts of The Los Angeles Times gave it three-and-a-half stars out of four, saying that "It's hard to believe it's been 15 years [since their first album Remedy], both because [Basement Jaxx] still sound great". Paste Magazine's Robert Ham, who rated it an 8.4 out of ten, opined that "If they’re trying to replicate the excess that sometimes comes with a night out, they’ve succeeded grandly. For home listening, on the other hand, it feels like overindulgence." Writing for Clash, Matt Oliver gave a score of seven out of ten, praising the world music elements which made "it a classic Jaxx party." He assumed the album would "come in for less fanfare than Basement Jaxx’s hit-laden past – but, for the sake of solidity across the board, it’s okay that this seventh album has no obvious breakout or festival showstopper." In a Popmatters review, Benjamin Aspray gave a verdict that while "Junto isn’t an unqualified success, and might not impress any outer-space musicologists anytime soon", it did "show us Basement Jaxx in transition, trying to paint maximalist strokes from a minimalist palette." Rolling Stone critic Julianne Escobedo Shepherd named it "a refreshing kick box to a dance scene full of mindless trendhopping", and gave it a three-and-a-half-star rating. A seven-out-of-ten review from NME's Chris Cottingham called the sound "Nothing new, then, but the Jaxx's sound returns re-energised." In his review for The Sydney Morning Herald, Craig Mathieson, awarding it three stars, concluding that "Instead of making an oversized statement after a lengthy absence, Felix Buxton and Simon Ratcliffe have slipped back into their favourite steps." Drowned in Sound's Sean Thomas said that "If you expect anything that deviates from their cemented formula or a radical reinvention, then Junto is not for you. If you are happy to enjoy the ride while it lasts, it is the perfect soundtrack to an Indian summer." Blue Sullivan of Slant Magazine described the record as "a faint but potent reminder of why this group was once so important to the genre, and coupled with their still-impressive ear for hooks, it ultimately makes this time-travelling tour through late-'90s/early-'00s electronica a trip worth taking." In The Guardian's review, Paul MacInnes called it their "decent return", and opined that "There may not be a standout track here – a Romeo or a Red Alert – and the desire to show their range (almost every track fuses a different style, from dancehall to trap or tropicalia) dilutes the effect of the whole. In each song, though, there'll be a small detail that hints at the skill of Simon Ratcliffe and Felix Buxton as producers."

On the more mixed side, Nate Patrin of Pitchfork Media wrote that "while Junto is at least happy enough to lift spirits, it feels like they've left it to others to reintroduce anarchy to the dancefloor." Katherine McLaughlin, reviewing for The Arts Desk, called it the group's "welcome but underwhelming return", and criticized the "lack of coherence" which "dampens a jumble of good vibrations, making the party atmosphere feel like a distant memory." The A.V. Club's Annie Zaleski concluded his review that "for the most part, Basement Jaxx are coloring within the lines on Junto, which leads to disappointing results." The Line of Best Fit writer John Daniel Bull gave it five out of ten stars, noting that the "Tracks on Junto merge into each other all too often, becoming background melodies when they should be at the forefront of the party." In a State review, Paula Kenny dismissed the record for having "predominately filler with songs that are too long and repetitive", described it as "a greatest hits album without any great hits." James West, who rated it two stars out of five in his article for DIY, said the album "should make for an eclectic, flag-waving affair - but sadly many of its disparate parts blissfully miss the mark." Resident Advisor's Abby Garnett called it "nice indeed, but it may leave you craving something a little stronger."

Track listing

Personnel 

Sources:
Main
Songwriting, production – Simon Ratcliffe, Felix Buxton
"Intro "

Vocals – Chay Lee
Background vocals – Narjge Barge

"Power to the People" 

Songwriting, vocals – Niara Scarlett
Background vocals – Audiences at the Basement Jaxx UK Tour 2013, Craigie, Dede Costa, Hope, Ketabul Studio All Stars, The, Moko, Rhonda Humphrey
Bridge vocals – Amara Charles, Kiarah Mills-Foster, Shamouy Mills-Foster
Kids chorus vocals – Ana Correira, Beatrice Lily Sutcliffe, Chantelle Alisa, Gabrielle Clements, Ibrahim Diallo, Katy Bethell, Rami Kablawi, Reggie Banigo, Ru Guramtunhu, Sarah Edstrom, Senam Ahadzi, Shola Durojaiye, Simba Mauhunduke, Sorcha Crowe
Brass, strings, woodwinds, flute – The Recycled Orchestra of Cateura, Paraguay
Harp – Sixto Corvalan
Trumpet – Ben Edwards

"Unicorn"

Vocals –Yzabel
Background vocals – Abigail Bailey, DJ Sneak, Vula Malinga

"Never Say Never"

Songwriting, vocals – ETML
Background vocals – Yzabel
Co-production –  Baunz
Kids chorus vocals – Charles, Kiarah and Shamouy Mills-Foster

"We Are Not Alone"

Vocals – Meleka
Background vocals – Cassie Watson, Sharlene Hector, Tasha Marikkar
Background vocals, human beatbox – Shakka
Kids chorus vocals – Charles, Kiarah and Shamouy Mills-Foster
Trumpet – Edwards

"What's the News"

Vocals – Alex Mills
Background vocals – Hector, Malinga

"Summer Dem"

Songwriting, vocals – Patricia Panther
Vocals – Scarlett, Tanya Lacey
Background vocals – Malinga
"Additional vibes" – Taiysha Norman Davis

"Buffalo"

Songwriting, vocals – Mykki Blanco
Background vocals – Lady Leshurr, Lonnie Liston Smith, Stylo G

"Rock This Road"

Songwriting, vocals –  Shakka
Background vocals – Julie of Ketabul Studios, Hector, Malinga

"Sneakin' Toronto"

Vocals – DJ Sneak, Buxton
Background vocals – Alma Duah
 
"Something About You"
Vocals – Lady Leshurr
"Mermaid of Salinas"

Songwriting, vocals – Nina Miranda
Songwriting , vocals, guitar – Andrea Terrano
Vocals – Elisangela Mahogany, Raghu Dixit, Sam Fox
Chorus vocals – Duncan F. Brown, Buxton, Kele Le Roc, Ratcliffe, Malinga
Co-production – Boris Brejcha, Michael Cleis
Trumpet – Edwards
 
"Love Is At Your Side"

Vocals – Sam Brookes
Background vocals – Bailey, Hector
Dulcimer – Chun Man

Charts

References

External links 

2014 albums
Basement Jaxx albums